Chindawol or Chendavol is a neighborhood in the older section of Kabul, Afghanistan.

Chindawol uprising

Population 
The majority of the people in this region are Qizilbash and Hazara.

See also 
 Neighborhoods of Kabul
 Chindawol uprising

References 

Neighborhoods of Kabul